The High Commission of The Gambia, London is the diplomatic mission of The Gambia in the United Kingdom. It is located on Ledbury Road in the Bayswater / Notting Hill area.

Between October 2013 and February 2018, it was known as the Embassy of The Gambia due to The Gambia's temporary withdrawal from the Commonwealth, thanks to Yahya Jammeh.

The High Commission had seen several protests in recent times: in 2013 by people opposed to the government of Yahya Jammeh and also in 2013 by those opposed to alleged homophobia in the country.

The Gambia returned to its membership of the Commonwealth on 8 February 2018. Therefore, Francis Blain the former Ambassador has now become the High Commissioner.

References

External links
 Official site

Gambia
Diplomatic missions of the Gambia
The Gambia–United Kingdom relations
Buildings and structures in the City of Westminster
The Gambia and the Commonwealth of Nations
United Kingdom and the Commonwealth of Nations
Bayswater